A mudflap  or mud guard is used in combination with the vehicle fender to protect the vehicle, passengers, other vehicles, and pedestrians from mud and other flying debris thrown into the air by the rotating tire. A mudflap is typically made from a flexible material such as rubber that is not easily damaged by contact with flying debris, the tire, or the road surface. 

On bicycles the mudflap is called a spoiler. It helps keep the rider(s) cleaner.

Mudflaps can be large rectangular sheets suspended behind the tires, or may be small molded lips below the rear of the vehicle's wheel wells. Mudflaps can be aerodynamically engineered, utilizing shaping, louvers or vents to improve airflow and lower drag.  

While some flaps are plain, in the colour of rubber, many contain company logos, other art or sometimes advertisements. Another is the mudflap girl, a woman's silhouette. 

In the United States, there are mudflap regulations that vary from state to state.

Aerodynamic 

Aerodynamic mudflaps are engineered with louvers or ventilated slats to improve airflow, reduce sidespray, and decrease aerodynamic drag, in order to improve fuel efficiency.

Supercomputing technology applied to the problem of semi-trailer truck drag has helped to validate such aerodynamic improvements. Traditional solid truck mudflaps can increase drag, but a study by the UT-Chattanooga SimCenter indicated slatted mudflaps can reduce drag more than 8 percent, making the truck's drag coefficient comparable to one without any mudflaps fitted.

A further advantage of the design is the heat-venting capacity of aerodynamically optimized mudflaps. The improved airflow promotes the quick release of otherwise re-circulated water and air from the fenderwell while improving performance by cooling the tires and brakes.

See also

 Bibb v. Navajo Freight Lines, Inc.
 Fender (vehicle)
 Parlok
 Pickup truck

References

Automotive accessories